The large-eared sheath-tailed bat (Emballonura dianae) is a species of sac-winged bat in the family Emballonuridae. It is found in Papua New Guinea and the Solomon Islands.

References

Emballonura
Mammals described in 1956
Mammals of Papua New Guinea
Mammals of the Solomon Islands
Taxonomy articles created by Polbot
Bats of New Guinea